Mennonites in Uruguay have been present since 1948. The Mennonites of Uruguay are made up of ethnic Plautdietsch-speaking Russian Mennonites, who are descendants of Friesian, Flemish and Prussian people, as well as Spanish-speaking Uruguayans of all ethnic backgrounds, that converted responding to the missionary efforts of the immigrants.

The immigrant belong to a group that is often referred to as Russian Mennonites, because they developed into an ethnic group in the Russian Empire. At the end of the century there were over 1,000 living on Uruguayan territory.

Origin
  
The majority of the 1,200 Mennonites who came to Uruguay in the aftermath of World War II lived for about 400 years in the Vistula delta until they were expulsed. A minority came from the region around Lemberg. They spoke and party still speak Plautdietsch, the language which developed in the Vistula delta and which until today unites all conservative "Russian" Mennonites, that have their origin in that region.

History

On October 27, 1948, the first group of about 750 arrived in Uruguay. They founded the El Ombú congregation in 1950. The second group of immigrants, comprising 429 persons, arrived 19 October 1951 and founded the Gartental Colony in 1952. A congregation was also organized in Montevideo the same year. The immigrants established three agricultural settlements, that have organized separate producer-consumer cooperatives. Each settlement has a school, retirement center, and a hospital-nursing home. A fourth colony, that is specialized in produce, was founded near Montevideo.

Colonies, membership and population

The immigrants established three agricultural settlements that have organized separate producer-consumer cooperatives. Each settlement has a school, retirement center, and a hospital-nursing home:
El Ombú, founded 1950
Gartental, founded 1952
Colonia Delta, founded 1955
Colonia Nicolich

In 1986 the four Russian Mennonite congregations had a membership of 525. There were 507 members in the four congregations in 2003, 572 in 2009 and 
607 in 2012. Altogether there were 1,457 members in 23 congregations in 2012, the majority not German speaking. Because only baptized adult members are counted, the whole Mennonite population including children is somewhat higher. A 2020 survey found that there are more than 200 Mennonite colonies in nine Latin American countries, with 3 in Uruguay.

Customs and beliefs

Although Uruguayan Mennonites are relatively integrated in the mainstream society, some of them still keep their original Plautdietsch language. There is strong tendency to marry outside the Mennonite community, which indicates a large degree of cultural assimilation. This is in stark contrast to other "Russian" Mennonites in South American countries like Paraguay, Bolivia and Argentina.

See also

 Germans in Uruguay
 Mennonites in the Netherlands

References

 
Uruguay